Bizarro is the second studio album by The Wedding Present. It was released in October 1989 by their record label, RCA.

About the album 
The Wedding Present's second studio album—and first "proper" album for RCA—came soon after the Ukrainian John Peel Sessions / Українські Виступи в Івана Піла folk music side project.

Technically speaking, only one single was taken from the album, "Kennedy", which provided the band with their first Top 40 hit, reaching #33. In early 1990, The Wedding Present re-recorded "Brassneck" with Steve Albini, which reached #24 in the UK charts. The single and its B-sides were later included on U.S. release of the album, and are also included on the Singles 1989-1991 compilation. The US CD version contains the Wedding Present's cover of "Box Elder", an early song by then unknown American band Pavement. A remastered CD version, released by BMG Camden in 2001, also features the B-sides of the "Kennedy" single, including a cover version of the Tom Jones hit "It's Not Unusual".

Track listing 
All tracks written by David Gedge (unless otherwise noted).

Original LP

Side A
 "Brassneck" – 4:51
 "Crushed" – 2:32
 "No" – 4:11
 "Thanks" – 2:22
 "Kennedy" – 4:20
 "What Have I Said Now?" – 5:18

Side B 
 "Granadaland" – 4:50
 "Bewitched" – 6:42
 "Take Me!" – 9:15
 "Be Honest" – 2:37

US CD release 
 "Brassneck" [original version] – 4:52
 "Crushed" – 2:32
 "No" – 4:11
 "Thanks" – 2:22
 "Kennedy" – 4:20
 "What Have I Said Now?" – 5:18
 "Granadaland" – 4:50
 "Bewitched" – 6:42
 "Take Me!" – 9:15
 "Brassneck" [Steve Albini version] – 4:22
 "Box Elder" (written by Pavement) – 2:14
 "Don't Talk Just Kiss" – 3:20
 "Gone" – 2:42
 "Be Honest" – 2:37

UK remastered CD 
 "Brassneck" [original version] – 4:52
 "Crushed" – 2:32
 "No" – 4:11
 "Thanks" – 2:22
 "Kennedy" – 4:20
 "What Have I Said Now?" – 5:18
 "Granadaland" – 4:50
 "Bewitched" – 6:42
 "Take Me!" – 9:15
 "Be Honest" – 2:37
 "Unfaithful" – 3:21
 "One Day This Will All Be Yours" – 2:02
 "It's Not Unusual" (Les Reed and Gordon Mills) – 2:09 
 "Brassneck" (Steve Albini version) – 4:22
 "Don't Talk Just Kiss" – 3:20
 "Gone" – 2:42
 "Box Elder" (written by Stephen Malkmus of Pavement) – 2:14

Personnel 
The Wedding Present
 David Gedge – vocals, guitar
 Peter Solowka – guitar
 Keith Gregory – bass guitar
 Simon Smith – drums
Additional musicians 
 Amelia Fletcher – backing vocals
Technical staff 
 Chris Allison – producer
 Steve Lyon – engineer
Artwork 
 The Designers Republic

References

External links 
 Scopitones, home of The Wedding Present

The Wedding Present albums
1989 albums
RCA Records albums
Albums with cover art by The Designers Republic